The Crimson Flame is the 77th title of the Hardy Boys Mystery Stories, written by Franklin W. Dixon.  It was published by Wanderer Books in 1983.

Plot summary
The plot begins with Frank and Joe witnessing a westerner being attacked by a notorious jewel thief Oscar Tamm. The westerner reveals himself as Alfred McVay and as an avid jewel collector. Due to suspicious happenings at his ranch house in Arizona, he hires the Hardys for protection.

Upon reaching there the Hardys start to investigate the strange happenings and develop an immediate dislike of the foreman, Wat Perkins. They are also intrigued by a "mysterious rider" who seems to be sending messages to someone in the ranch house. They also grow suspicious of the butler Wilbur.

When a tornado strikes the ranch, the Crimson Flame, a priceless ruby gets stolen. McVay becomes morose and the Hardys, with a couple of clues, pursue the jewel thieves to Thailand. The rest of the plot follows how the boys help capture the crooks and eventually, how the lost ruby is found.

Notes
In Chapter 1, it is revealed that Frank and Joe have their full detective credentials, and are professional detectives.

The Hardy Boys books
1982 American novels
1982 children's books
Novels set in Arizona
Novels set in Thailand